Boiga nigriceps (black-headed cat snake) is a species of colubrid snake from South-East Asia.

Description

It gets its name from the greenish to blackish coloration of its head. Neonates and juveniles do not exhibit this dark color on the head until adulthood. The body color ranges greatly from brown, orange, red, and even black. The ventral region of the snake is yellowish below the neck and white for the rest.

Subspecies
Two subspecies are recognized:
 Boiga nigriceps nigriceps (Günther, 1863)
 Boiga nigriceps brevicauda Smith, 1926

Distribution
Indonesia, Borneo, Peninsular Malaysia, Thailand.

Habitat
The black-headed cat snake is arboreal, but frequently comes down to the ground in search of prey. They occupy lowland and mid-elevation tropical rainforests of Southeast Asia.

Venom
Little is known about the black-headed cat snake's venom toxicity on humans, but it is thought to be comparable to the severity of a copperhead. This rear fanged colubrid's bite rarely results in adverse effects due to its poor venom delivery system. Luckily their fangs' positioning doesn't result in any significant envenomation.

Symptoms tend to stay localized to the envenomation site, limiting the victim to minor pain.

Diet
The black-headed cat snake feeds on lizards, frogs, birds, small mammals and other snakes in the wild.

References 

nigriceps
Snakes of Southeast Asia
Reptiles of Indonesia
Reptiles of Malaysia
Reptiles of Thailand
Reptiles of Borneo
Reptiles described in 1863
Taxa named by Albert Günther